Kreisler is a surname. Notable people with the surname include:

 Fritz Kreisler, Austria-born American violinist and composer
 Georg Kreisler, Austrian-American German-language cabarettist
 Harry Kreisler, American historian

Fictional characters:
 Johannes Kreisler, character from various novels by E.T.A. Hoffmann

See also
 Kreisleriana
 Chrysler (disambiguation)

Jewish surnames
Yiddish-language surnames